822X Squadron is a Royal Australian Navy Fleet Air Arm squadron established in October 2018. Its role is to trial unmanned aerial vehicles.

History
The RAN established a Navy UAS Development Unit in late 2012. This unit was tasked with experimenting with a UAV to test the type's suitability and begin developing procedures. It began flying its first UAV, a leased Boeing Insitu ScanEagle, in March 2013. The Navy purchased two ScanEagles in June 2015, and the unit was renamed the Naval Unmanned Aircraft Systems Unit.  Schiebel Camcopter S-100 UAVs were acquired in late 2016, and accepted into RAN service on 30 April 2018.

822X Squadron was formed at HMAS Albatross on 25 October 2018 by redesignating the Naval Unmanned Aircraft Systems Unit. The X in its title indicates that it is a developmental unit; this is the first time the Royal Australian Navy has used such a designation.

The squadron's role is to experiment with operating UAVs and develop procedures for integrating them into the Navy. Upon formation, the squadron was equipped with Insitu ScanEagle and Camcopter S-100 UAVs. These are intelligence UAVs equipped with high quality cameras. 822X Squadron's title was drawn from the serial number of the Naval Unmanned Aircraft Systems Unit's first aircraft, a ScanEagle designated AV1422.

As of October 2018, the RAN intended to trial the Camcopter S-100s and ScanEagles for three to five years, and purchase other UAVs in the 2022-23 financial year.

References

Flying squadrons of the Royal Australian Navy
Military units and formations established in 2018
2018 establishments in Australia